The Battle of Sunda Strait was a naval battle which occurred during World War II in the Sunda Strait between the islands of Java, and Sumatra. On the night of 28 February 1 March 1942, the Australian light cruiser , American heavy cruiser , and Dutch destroyer  faced a major Imperial Japanese Navy (IJN) task force. After a fierce battle lasting several hours, all Allied ships were sunk. Five Japanese ships were sunk, three of them by friendly fire.

Background

In late February 1942, Japanese amphibious forces were preparing to invade Java, in the Dutch East Indies. On 27 February, the main American-British-Dutch-Australian Command (ABDACOM) naval force, under Admiral Karel Doorman–a Dutch officer–steamed northeast from Surabaya to intercept an Imperial Japanese navy invasion fleet. This part of the ABDA force consisted of two heavy cruisers, including  under the command of Captain Albert H. Rooks, three light cruisers, including  under Captain Hector Waller, and nine destroyers. Only six out of nine of USS Houstons  heavy guns were operational because her aft gun turret had been knocked out in an earlier Japanese air raid. The  force engaged the Japanese force in the Battle of the Java Sea. The Allied ships were all sunk or dispersed. Houston and Perth both retreated to Tanjung Priok, Java, the main port of Batavia, Dutch East Indies, where they arrived at 13:30 on 28 February.

Prelude
In the early evening on 28 February, Houston, Perth and the Dutch destroyer  received orders to depart Tanjung Priok and head through Sunda Strait to Tjilatjap, on the south coast of Java. Waller, who had seniority, was de facto commander of this force. The only ships they expected to encounter were Australian corvettes on patrol, in and around the strait itself. While Houston and Perth left at 19:00, Evertsen was not ready and followed the cruisers two hours later.

By chance, just after 22:00, a Japanese invasion convoy bound for West Java including the entire Sixteenth Army, under Lieutenant General Hitoshi Imamura, in over 50 transport ships was entering Bantam Bay, near the north-west tip of Java. The Japanese troop transports were escorted by the 5th Destroyer Flotilla, led by Rear Admiral Kenzaburo Hara, and the 7th Cruiser Division, under Vice Admiral Takeo Kurita.

Some time around 23:15, the Allied ships were sighted by the patrolling Fubuki, which followed them surreptitiously. At 23:06, when they were about halfway across the mouth of Bantam Bay, Perth sighted a ship about  ahead, near Saint Nicolaas Point. The ship was soon identified as a Japanese destroyer (probably Harukaze). Waller reported the contact and ordered his forward turrets to open fire.

Main action

During a ferocious night action, the Allied cruisers were surrounded. Following severe damage from torpedo and shell impacts, Perth and Houston were abandoned after midnight and sank.

About four Japanese transports and a minesweeper were sunk by friendly torpedoes that had missed their target. (Two of these transports were later refloated.) One of the Japanese transports sunk was Ryujo Maru, carrying Lieutenant General Imamura, who had to jump overboard. He was later rescued by the crew of a small boat and taken ashore.

Destroyer action 

Meanwhile, as Evertsen was trying to catch up with Houston and Perth, her crew spotted the tracers and intense shellfire of the main action. Her captain ordered a course northwest towards Pulau Mundu island, off the west coast of Sumatra, then hugged the Sumatran coast as Evertsen turned south to head through Sunda Strait.

However, Evertsen was spotted by Murakumo and Shirakumo, looking for more escaping Allied ships. Both immediately illuminated Evertsen with their searchlights and took her under fire. Evertsen attempted to evade by turning west, but after turning southward again, the Dutch destroyer again encountered the Japanese destroyers. Evertsen was hit repeatedly, but temporarily disengaged under a smokescreen. By then, however, Evertsens stern was on fire. Still taking Japanese fire, the captain ordered his crew to ground Evertsen on a coastal reef. Firing all her torpedoes, the remaining crew escaped ashore before the fire reached the aft magazine, causing an explosion that blew off most of the stern.

Aftermath

Officially the Allied personnel killed during the battle included 696 members of the crew of Houston and 375 from Perth, including the captains of both vessels, Rooks and Waller. The survivors were picked up by Japanese vessels and taken prisoner, included 368 from Houston and 307 from Perth. Rooks was posthumously awarded the Medal of Honor for his actions. The majority of Evertsens crew was taken prisoner on 9–10 March 1942 and were held by the Japanese for three and a half years.

The crew of the Japanese cruiser Mikuma suffered six killed and 11 wounded, as a result of damage caused by Houston. A direct shell hit to the bridge of the destroyer Shirayuki killed one crew member and wounded 11; Harukaze suffered hits to her bridge, engine room and rudder, killing three and wounding more than 15 others.

See also 
 Burma Railway
 Houston Volunteers
 Lost Battalion (Pacific, World War II)

Notes

References

Further reading
 
 
 
 
 
 
 
 
 
 
  – Firsthand account of the battle by a survivor from USS Houston

External links
 Naval History (no date), "1942 03 01 0100 Surface Action Battle Of Sunda Strait" 
 
 

South West Pacific theatre of World War II
Sunda Strait
Sunda Strait
Sunda Strait
Sunda Strait
Sunda Strait
Japanese occupation of the Dutch East Indies
1942 in Japan
Sunda Strait
February 1942 events
March 1942 events